My Little One (Italian: Piccola mia) is a 1933 Italian drama film directed by Eugenio de Liguoro and starring Germana Paolieri, Ernesto Sabbatini and Alessandra De Stefani. A woman in a loveless marriage leaves her husband and child for another man.

It was shot at the Farnesina Studios in Rome. The film's sets were designed by Alfredo Montori.

Cast
 Germana Paolieri as Maria Albani  
 Ernesto Sabbatini as Ugo Albani - suo marito  
 Alessandra De Stefani as La piccola Adriana - lora figlia  
 Guido Celano as Paolo Vallini - il corridore automobilista  
 Alessandro De Stefani 
 Ernesto Marini as Cesarino  
 Lola Braccini as Anna, la governante  
 María Denis as La ragazza nel bar all'aperto  
 Gino Viotti as Un impiegato della società automobilista  
 Mario Siletti as Un vigile urbano 
 Franco Coop

References

Bibliography 
 Chiti, Roberto & Poppi, Roberto. I film: Tutti i film italiani dal 1930 al 1944. Gremese Editore, 2005.
 Stewart, John. Italian Film: A Who's Who, McFarland, 1994.

External links 
 
 My little One at Variety Distribution

1933 drama films
Italian drama films
1933 films
1930s Italian-language films
Films directed by Eugenio de Liguoro
Italian black-and-white films
1930s Italian films